Heikki Kivikko (born 31 December 1963) is a Finnish cross-country skier. He competed in the 50 km event at the 1988 Winter Olympics.

Cross-country skiing results
All results are sourced from the International Ski Federation (FIS).

Olympic Games

World Cup

Season standings

References

External links
 

1963 births
Living people
Finnish male cross-country skiers
Olympic cross-country skiers of Finland
Cross-country skiers at the 1988 Winter Olympics
People from Ähtäri
Sportspeople from South Ostrobothnia